The 2002–03 Slovenian Football Cup was the twelfth season of the Slovenian Football Cup, Slovenia's football knockout competition.

Qualified clubs

2001–02 Slovenian PrvaLiga members
Celje
Domžale
Gorica
Koper
Korotan Prevalje
Maribor
Mura
Olimpija
Primorje
Rudar Velenje
Šmartno
Triglav Kranj

Qualified through MNZ Regional Cups
MNZ Ljubljana: Ljubljana, Bela Krajina, Livar
MNZ Maribor: Železničar Maribor, Dravograd, Pohorje
MNZ Celje: Krško, Vransko
MNZ Koper: Korte, Jadran
MNZ Nova Gorica: Bilje, Tolmin
MNZ Murska Sobota: Tišina, Roma
MNZ Lendava: Črenšovci, Nafta Lendava
MNZG-Kranj: Bled, Britof
MNZ Ptuj: Stojnci, Aluminij

First round

|}

Round of 16

|}

Quarter-finals

|}

Semi-finals

|}

Final

First leg

Second leg

Olimpija won the cup on away goals.

References

Slovenian Football Cup seasons
Cup
Slovenian Cup